Frederick Randon (24 June 1845 – 17 February 1883) was an English first-class cricketer.

Randon was born at Stapleford in June 1845. He made his debut in first-class cricket for the Marylebone Cricket Club against the North at Lord's in 1874. He played first-class cricket until 1876, making fifteen appearances, including playing for the Players of the North in 1874 and the North in 1875. In fifteen first-class appearances, he scored 104 runs with a high score of 23 not out. With his right-arm roundarm fast bowling, he took 37 wickets at an average of 17.70, with best figures of 6 for 54. One of two five-wicket hauls he took, these figures came for the Marylebone Cricket Club against Nottinghamshire in 1874. Besides playing, Randon worked as coach at some of the top public schools, including Eton College and Wellington College. He stood as an umpire in first-class matches on six occasions between 1875–80. While playing at Lord's in 1881, he was seriously injured when struck on the head by a ball. He never fully recovered and died in February 1883. His son, Frederick junior, was also a first-class cricketer.

See also 

 List of unusual deaths
 Ray Chapman, an American baseball player killed after being struck by a ball during a game; he was the only player in Major League Baseball history to die of an in-game injury

 List of fatalities while playing cricket

References

External links

1845 births
1883 deaths
People from Stapleford, Nottinghamshire
Cricketers from Nottinghamshire
English cricketers
Marylebone Cricket Club cricketers
Players of the North cricketers
North v South cricketers
English cricket umpires
Cricket deaths
Sport deaths in England